Centro Cívico is a Buenos Aires Premetro station which serves as a terminus of a side branch. The adjacent station is Ana Díaz. The station was opened on 29 April 1987 together with most other stations of Premetro.

References

Buenos Aires PreMetro stations
1987 establishments in Argentina
Railway stations opened in 1987